Cenochlora is a genus of moths in the family Geometridae.

Species
 Cenochlora quieta (Lucas, 1892)

References

 Cenochlora at Markku Savela's Lepidoptera and Some Other Life Forms
 Natural History Museum Lepidoptera genus database

Geometrinae